Sheldon Powe-Hobbs  (born 2 January 1992) is a Scotland international rugby league footballer who plays as a  or  for the Northern Pride club in the Queensland Cup.

Background
Powe-Hobbs was born in Cairns, Queensland, Australia.

Playing career
Powe-Hobbs is a Scotland international. He made his representative début for Scotland against Australia in the opening match of the 2016 Rugby League Four Nations.

References

External links
QRL profile

1992 births
Living people
Australian rugby league players
Australian people of Scottish descent
Northern Pride RLFC players
Rugby league players from Cairns
Rugby league props
Rugby league second-rows
Scotland national rugby league team players